Lensky (masculine), Lenskaya (feminine), or Lenskoye (neuter) is the name of several rural localities in Russia.

Modern inhabited localities
Lensky, Altai Krai, a settlement in Lukovsky Selsoviet of Pankrushikhinsky District of Altai Krai
Lenskoye, a village in Babyninsky District of Kaluga Oblast
Lenskaya, a village in Mekhonsky Selsoviet of Shatrovsky District of Kurgan Oblast

Abolished inhabited localities
Lensky, Bryansk Oblast, a settlement in Ponurovsky Selsoviet of Starodubsky District of Bryansk Oblast; abolished in May 2010